is a railway station in the city of Shimada, Shizuoka Prefecture, Japan, operated by the Ōigawa Railway.

Lines
Daikanchō Station is on the Ōigawa Main Line and is 3.8km from the terminus of the line at Kanaya Station.

Station layout
The station has a single side platform and a rustic log-cabin style wooden station building.

Adjacent stations

|-
!colspan=5|Ōigawa Railway

Station history
Daikanchō Station was opened on September 16, 1965.

Passenger statistics
In fiscal 2017, the station was used by an average of 20 passengers daily (boarding passengers only).

Surrounding area
former Kanaya Town Hall
Kawane Junior High School
Kawane Elementary School

See also
 List of Railway Stations in Japan

References

External links

 Ōigawa Railway home page

Stations of Ōigawa Railway
Railway stations in Shizuoka Prefecture
Railway stations in Japan opened in 1965
Shimada, Shizuoka